The Bonch-Bruevich Saint Petersburg State University of Telecommunications Russian: Санкт-Петербургский государственный университет телекоммуникаций им. проф. М.А.Бонч-Бруевича; Russian: СПбГУТ, SUT) is known as a university in the area of communications and telecommunications. The Bonch-Bruevich University offers training programs in communications and telecommunications, information technologies, computer science, economics, management, advertising and public relations.

SPbSUT is a founding member of the Association of European Universities and Companies of Informatics and Computer Electronics (EUNICE).

History 

The Saint Petersburg State University of Telecommunications was established in 1930 under the name Leningrad Institute of Communication Engineers. Its history is associated closely with the development of Russian and world science in the communications area, and with a great scientific and technical base.

From 1931 to 1940, the Russian scientist in radio mechanics and corresponding member of the USSR Academy of Sciences, Professor Mikhail Bonch-Bruevich, was the Head of the Chair of theoretical radio engineering in the Leningrad Electro-Technical Institute. He was a doctor of technical sciences, one of the originators of Spark Discharge Theory, as well as the Theory of Radio wave Transmission in the Upper Atmosphere, and creator of the first electronic tubes, radio-telephone transmitters, radio-telephone tube stations, etc. In honor of Professor Bonch-Bruevich's scientific contributions, and in accordance with the USSR Council of People's Commissars' Decree of 8 June 1940, the Leningrad Institute of Communication Engineers was renamed as the Leningrad Electro-Technical Institute of Communications (LEIC), named after Bonch-Bruevich.

In 1993, SUT was reconstituted, and gained its new status as the Bonch-Bruevich Saint Petersburg State University of Telecommunications, by order of the Ministry of Communication of Russian Federation. New chairs were created: digital signal processing, communication networks, information safety of telecommunication systems, biomedical technology, information-managing systems, global information technologies, global info-communication networks and systems.

Structure 

As of September 2014, the university has 8 faculties, 1 institute and 6 research centers. 
The full list of faculties, according to the official web-site:
 Faculty of RADIO TECHNOLOGIES of COMMUNICATION. 
 Faculty of INFOCOMMUNICATION NETWORKS and SYSTEMS. 
 Faculty of INFORMATION SYSTEMS AND TECHNOLOGIES. 
 Faculty of FUNDAMENTAL TRAINING. 
 Faculty of ECONOMICS AND MANAGEMENT. 
 Faculty of HUMANITIES. 
 Faculty of PART-TIME and DISTANCE LEARNING.  
 Faculty of UPSKILLING AND RETRAINING OF ACADEMIC ENGINEERS. 
 Institute OF MILITARY EDUCATION. 
 Research and Education Center "Research of problems in infocommunication technologies and protocols". 
 Research and Education Center "Wireless infotelecommunication networks". 
 Research and Education Center  "Technology of information and education systems". 
 Research and Education Center "Media Center". 
 Scientific and Technological Center "Optical communication elements" 
 Research and Education Center "Programming laboratory". 
 Education Center Cisco Systems.
 Education Center Huawei Technologies.

College and University Branches 

Saint Petersburg College of  Telecommunications

Archangelsk College of  Telecommunications

Smolensk College of  Telecommunications

Notable alumni 
 Boris Gryzlov
 Viktor Ivanov
 Leonid Reiman

References

External links 
 Homepage of Saint Petersburg State University of Telecommunications named after Bonch-Bruevich (in English)
 The website for Scientific and Research Activities of SPbSUT (in Russian)

Universities in Saint Petersburg
1930 establishments in the Soviet Union
Telecommunications organizations
Telecommunication education